Nikoloz Gagua (born June 21, 1975) is a Georgian politician who served as the Minister of Finance from 21 June until 12 July 2018, and served as the Deputy Minister of Finance until 2021, a position he previously held from November 2016 until June 2018. Right now he is member of the Council of the National Bank of Georgia and the Vice-President of the same institution.

Gagua graduated from the Tbilisi State University in 1997 with the specialization in economics. He got the MA degree in economics at Vienna University (1998) and Williams College (2013) as well.

References

External links
 Official biography at Ministry of Finance website

1982 births
21st-century politicians from Georgia (country)
Living people
Politicians from Tbilisi
Finance ministers of Georgia
Georgian Dream politicians
Government ministers of Georgia (country)
Tbilisi State University alumni
Williams College alumni